Cunningham is a city in Kingman County, Kansas, United States.  As of the 2020 census, the population of the city was 444.  The city was named in honor of J.D. Cunningham, a pioneer settler.

History
The history of Cunningham starts with the town of Ninnescah, which was located near and named after the Ninnescah River. The Ninnescah Post Office opened August 20, 1885. Later the town of Cunningham was established a few miles to the west, on the north side of the railroad. There was a movement among the locals to move the town of Ninnescah to Cunningham. Some buildings were physically moved from Ninnescah to Cunningham in 1887 and 1888. A tornado destroyed most of Ninnescah on March 24, 1888, which sealed its fate.

Cunningham was incorporated as a city in 1908.

Geography
Cunningham is located at  (37.645889, -98.432197).

Demographics

2010 census
As of the census of 2010, there were 454 people, 183 households, and 114 families living in the city. The racial makeup of the city was 97.4% White, 0.4% African American, 0.9% Native American, 0.4% from other races, and 0.9% from two or more races. Hispanic or Latino of any race were 0.9% of the population.

There were 183 households, of which 22.4% had children under the age of 18 living with them, 51.4% were married couples living together, 8.2% had a female householder with no husband present, 2.7% had a male householder with no wife present, and 37.7% were non-families. 34.4% of all households were made up of individuals, and 19.7% had someone living alone who was 65 years of age or older. The average household size was 2.14 and the average family size was 2.68.

The median age in the city was 50.7 years. 18.1% of residents were under the age of 18; 6% were between the ages of 18 and 24; 17.4% were from 25 to 44; 29.3% were from 45 to 64; and 29.1% were 65 years of age or older. The gender makeup of the city was 46.3% male and 53.7% female.

2000 census
As of the census of 2000, there were 514 people, 189 households, and 130 families living in the city. The racial makeup of the city was 98.05% White, 0.58% African American, 0.19% Native American, 0.19% Asian, 0.58% from other races, and 0.39% from two or more races. Hispanic or Latino of any race were 0.78% of the population.

There were 189 households, out of which 31.7% had children under the age of 18 living with them, 57.7% were married couples living together, 9.0% had a female householder with no husband present, and 31.2% were non-families. 29.1% of all households were made up of individuals, and 18.5% had someone living alone who was 65 years of age or older. The average household size was 2.35 and the average family size was 2.92.

In the city, the population was spread out, with 24.1% under the age of 18, 3.1% from 18 to 24, 21.0% from 25 to 44, 21.8% from 45 to 64, and 30.0% who were 65 years of age or older. The median age was 47 years. For every 100 females, there were 79.7 males. For every 100 females age 18 and over, there were 71.1 males.

The median income for a household in the city was $33,438, and the median income for a family was $36,964. Males had a median income of $26,500 versus $21,406 for females. The per capita income for the city was $16,248. About 9.8% of families and 9.9% of the population were below the poverty line, including 14.3% of those under age 18 and 8.1% of those age 65 or over.

Government
The Cunningham government consists of a mayor and five council members.

Education
The community is served by Cunningham–West Kingman County USD 332 public school district.
 Cunningham High School
 Cunningham Grade School
The Cunningham Wildcats won the Kansas State High School boys class 1A Track & Field championship in 2008.

Library
 Cunningham Public Library

Transportation
 U.S. Route 54 passes through Cunningham.

Gallery

References

Further reading

External links

City
 City of Cunningham
 Cunningham - Directory of Public Officials
Historical
 A History of Cunningham
 Historic Images of Cunningham, Special Photo Collections at Wichita State University Library.
Maps
 Cunningham city map, KDOT
 USGS Topo Map of Cunningham / Skellyville area, USGS

Cities in Kansas
Cities in Kingman County, Kansas